2018–19 Belarusian Cup is the twenty eighth season of the Belarusian annual cup competition. Contrary to the league season, it is conducted in a fall-spring rhythm. It started in May 2018 and concluded with a final match in May 2019. Winners of the Cup will qualified for the first qualifying round of the 2019–20 UEFA Europa League.

Participating clubs 
The following teams will take part in the competition:

First round
In this round 2 amateur clubs were drawn against 2 Second League clubs. The draw was performed on 3 May 2018. The matches were played on 12 and 13 May 2018. 

Another 3 amateur clubs and 12 Second League clubs were given a bye to the Second Round. Rukh Brest did not participate.

Second round
In this round 2 winners of the First Round were joined by another 30 clubs. The draw was performed on 3 May 2018. The matches were played on 11 and 13 June 2018.

Round of 32
In this round 16 winners of the Second Round were drawn against 16 Premier League clubs.

Round of 16
The draw was performed on 30 June 2018.

Quarter-finals
The draw was performed on 9 October 2018. The matches were played in March 2019.

|}

First leg

Second leg

Semi-finals
The draw was performed on 18 March 2019. The matches were played in April and May 2019.

|}

First leg

Second leg

Final
The final was played on 26 May 2019 at Vitebsky Central Sport Complex in Vitebsk.

References

External links
 Football.by

2018–19 European domestic association football cups
Cup
Cup
2018-19